Craigarogan is a small village, electoral division and townland to the west of Newtownabbey in County Antrim, Northern Ireland. The settlement has developed at the junction of the Bernice Road and the Clarke Lodge Road. The settlement of Roughfort is also within the townland. In the 2001 Census it had a population of 69 people. It is part of Antrim and Newtownabbey district.

Places of interest 

Craigarogan chamber tomb or passage grave (in Irish: Carn Greine, i.e. Cairn of the Sun). Locally it is pronounced as Carngraney and as a result sometimes called Granny's Grave (which is also a corruption of Grania's Grave). (OS map ref: J270842).

References 

NI Neighbourhood Information System
Irish megaliths - Craigarogan
Irish megaliths
Henry Joy McCracken

Villages in County Antrim
Townlands of County Antrim